Matters was a  Canadian indie rock band from Guelph, Ontario. The band consisted of Tim Bruton (guitar/synth), Kyle Donnelly (bass), John O'Regan (lead vocals/guitar/keyboard) and Greg Santilly (drums). They played rock music that had elements of punk, dance, and art rock, and used multiple transitions and hooks rather than traditional verse/chorus song structures.

History

The D'Urbervilles
Formed in 2005 as The D'Urbervilles while the members were students at the University of Guelph, the band originally consisted of O'Regan, Bruton, Donnelly, and drummer C.L. Smith.  Prior to Smith's departure, the band independently released their debut EP The D'Urbervilles, which reached No. 37 on earshot!s Canadian campus and community radio charts for the month of May 2006.  The D'Urbervilles toured and recorded their debut album, We Are the Hunters, with replacement drummers Steve Hesselink and Adam Seward before selecting Santilly as a permanent member in the fall of 2007.  We Are the Hunters was released on the Toronto label Out of This Spark on February 19, 2008 and hit No. 13 on the earshot! charts for the month of March. The band completed work on their second full-length, although they have gone on record as saying it's unlikely to be released.

As the D'Urbervilles, the group has toured alongside Malajube, You Say Party! We Say Die!,  Immaculate Machine and Forest City Lovers in addition to performing at Pop Montreal, SXSW, Ottawa Bluesfest, and NXNE.

Change of name
The band changed their name to Matters in March 2011 to signal their shift in musical direction and visual style.

Discography

Singles
Get In Or Get Out 7" - Hype Lighter - 2011

Albums
The D'Urbervilles - Independent - 2006.
We Are the Hunters - Out of This Spark - 2008.

Compilations
 Friends in Bellwoods - Out of This Spark - 2007.
 Friends in Bellwoods 2 - Out of This Spark - 2009.

Member associated acts
Kyle Donnelly is a member of Forest City Lovers. 
Tim Bruton also performs with Forest City Lovers, Evening Hymns, and The Magic. 
Greg Santilly plays in Slow Hand Motëm. 
John O'Regan performs solo as Diamond Rings.

See also

Music of Canada
Canadian rock
List of Canadian musicians
List of bands from Canada
:Category:Canadian musical groups

References

External links
 Matters

Musical groups established in 2005
Canadian indie rock groups
Musical groups from Guelph
2005 establishments in Ontario
Musical groups disestablished in 2011
2011 disestablishments in Ontario